FC Dynamo Barnaul is a Russian professional club from Barnaul, founded in 1957. It plays in the third-tier of the FNL 2. It played amateur level football for the 2013–14 season, after failing its licence due to debts owed to players.

League results

Current squad
As of 22 February 2023, according to the official Second League website.

References

External links
Official website 

Football clubs in Russia
Sport in Barnaul
Barnaul
1957 establishments in Russia
Association football clubs established in 1957